Jack N. Lightstone  is a Canadian professor of history, and former President and Vice-Chancellor of Brock University in St. Catharines, Ontario.  He took office on July 1, 2006, to serve a five-year term as President and as a professor of history.

Background 
Lightstone was born in Ottawa, Ontario. He received his BA from Carleton University in 1972, his MA in 1974 and went on to complete his Ph.D. in 1977 at Brown University in Rhode Island.

He is an expert on ancient and contemporary North American Judaism, has lectured extensively and written six books. He is fluent in three languages - English, French and Hebrew.

Administrative career 
Prior to Brock, he was Provost and Vice-Rector at Concordia University in Montreal, where he is credited. with leading an extensive academic planning overhaul while under budget constraints.

Works

References

External links
 Biography, from university website

Academic staff of Brock University
Brown University alumni
Carleton University alumni
Living people
People from Ottawa
Canadian university and college chief executives
1951 births